Mikhail Vitalyevich Ulibin (born 31 May 1971) is a Russian chess player, who was awarded the title of grandmaster by FIDE in 1991. 

He played in the Soviet junior championships of 1984, 1985 (3rd place), 1986, 1987, and 1988 (tied for 1st–2nd with Gata Kamsky). Ulibin took the silver medal in the World Junior Chess Championship of 1991. 

In 1994, he finished second behind Peter Svidler in the Russian championship at Elista and played for Russia's second team in the Moscow Chess Olympiad. His team took he bronze medal.

He won the 1998/1999 Rilton Cup in Stockholm. In 2001, Ulibin won the Monarch Assurance International tournament at Port Erin, Isle of Man. In 2002, he won the Masters' tournament of the 12th Abu Dhabi Chess Festival edging out Evgeny Gleizerov and Shukhrat Safin on tiebreak, after all finished on 6½/9 points. In 2003, he tied for 3rd–10th with Vladimir Belov, Alexei Kornev, Farrukh Amonatov, Alexey Kim, Alexander Areshchenko, Andrey Shariyazdanov, and Spartak Vysochin in the St. Petersburg 300 Open tournament. Ulibin came first in the Master Open Tournament in Biel 2007 and in the Zagreb Open in 2010. In 2011, he won the Central Serbia Championship in Paraćin; tied for 2nd–6th with Konstantine Shanava, Maxim Turov, Robert Hovhannisyan, and Levon Babujian in the 4th Karen Asrian Memorial tournament in Jermuk; and came first at Winterthur.

References

External links

Mikhail Ulibin chess games at 365Chess.com

1971 births
Living people
Chess grandmasters
Russian chess players
Soviet chess players
Chess Olympiad competitors
Place of birth missing (living people)